The Bohn Towers is a 1972-erected 204-foot 22-story high-rise apartment building complex in the Reserve Square area of downtown Cleveland. It is named after one of the former directors of the Cuyahoga Metropolitan Housing Authority, Ernest J. Bohn, who directed the agency responsible for public housing in the urban area of Cleveland from 1933 until 1968. The Bohn is known for its modern style apartment dwelling design, which almost approaches the brutalist style. The Bohn sits directly east of the Reserve Square East and West Towers.

The property is listed in the CMHA registry as a senior living high rise in the downtown neighborhood of Cleveland and is one of only a handful of such properties in the central business district. In recent years the city of Cleveland and Cuyahoga County have experienced a great demand and need for such housing as older couples shed the demands of maintaining suburban housing and seek to live in the urban centers of Cleveland, Akron, Lakewood and Parma.

References

Residential skyscrapers in Cleveland
Apartment buildings in Cleveland
Public housing in the United States
Residential buildings completed in 1972